The Yamaguchi at-large district is a constituency of the House of Councillors in the Diet of Japan (national legislature). It consists of the entire prefecture of Yamaguchi and is represented by two Councillors electing one every three years.

Single-member districts usually get higher attention in House of Councillors elections because they are easier to swing completely than multi-member districts. But Yamaguchi has consistently voted for LDP candidates between the 1960s and 1980s. In the 1989 election when the ruling LDP lost the upper house majority for the first time, Socialist Kenichi Yamada beat incumbent Masuo Matsuoka by a margin of more than 100,000 votes. Matsuoka later ran as an independent and won Yamaguchi again in 1998. He later joined the Democratic Party of Japan.

Currently Yamaguchi is represented by two Councillors:
 Tsuneo Kitamura (LDP, Abe faction)
 Kiyoshi Ejima (LDP, Abe faction)

Elected Councillors

References 

Districts of the House of Councillors (Japan)